Supersystem was a band from Washington, D.C. described as a mix of rock, punk, pop and dance music. Originally El Guapo, the group changed their name after adding a new drummer and because of a general dislike of the original name. El Guapo consisted of keyboardist Pete Cafarella, guitarist Rafael Cohen, bassist "Justin Destroyer" (Justin Moyer), and drummer Nate Smith; Smith left the band before they signed to Dischord. Supersystem consisted of Cafarella, Cohen, Moyer, and drummer Joshua Blair.

The group disbanded in November 2006. Moyer records and tours under the name "Edie Sedgwick"; Blair drums in Orthrelm; Cafarella and Smith play in the duo Shy Child; and Cohen is a member of !!!.

Discography

References

External links
 Touch and Go Records -
  - Review of A Million Microphones on Silent Uproar
 Shy Child - Pete Cafarella drums/keyboard duo
 Orthrelm - Josh Blair guitar/drums duo
 Edie Sedgwick - Justin Moyer performance project
 Antelope - Official Site
Touch and Go Records 25th Anniversary footage of Supersystem performance and interview

Rock music groups from Washington, D.C.
Dischord Records artists
Touch and Go Records artists